The Birds of the Air (also referred to as The Fowls of the Air or The Lilies of the Field) is a discourse given by Jesus during his Sermon on the Mount as recorded in the Gospel of Matthew and the Sermon on the Plain in the Gospel of Luke in the New Testament. The discourse makes several references to the natural world: ravens (in Luke), lilies and moths are all mentioned.

From Matthew 6:25–33 (King James Version (KJV)):

From  (KJV):

The New King James Version incorporates  within the same section:

Commentary
St. Augustine says that this parable should be taken at face value and not allegorized. Its meaning is clearly stated:
...seek ye [first] the kingdom of God, and his righteousness; and all these things shall be added unto you.

Danish philosopher Søren Kierkegaard often referred to Matthew 6:26. For him the birds of the air and the lilies of the field represented instructors in "religious joy", an appreciation that "there is a today". For him learning joy was to learn to let go of tomorrow, not in the sense of failing to plan or provide, but in giving one's attention to the tasks of today without knowing what they will have meant.
Worldly worry always seeks to lead a human being into the small-minded unrest of comparisons, away from the lofty calmness of simple thoughts. ... Should not the invitation to learn from the lilies be welcome to everyone ... As the ingenuity and busyness increase, there come to be more and more in each generation who slavishly work a whole lifetime far down in the low underground regions of comparisons. Indeed, just as miners never see the light of day, so these unhappy people never come to see the light: those uplifting, simple thoughts, those first thoughts about how glorious it is to be a human being.

M. Conrad Myers sees in the reference to Solomon "and all his glory" a subtle echo of Ecclesiastes 2:11 "But when I turned to all the works that my hands had wrought, and to the toil at which I had taken such pains, behold! all was vanity and a chase after wind, with nothing gained under the sun."

While various attempts have been made to identify the specific type of flower, G. E. Post suggests "lily" is here meant to include a wide assortment of wild flowers.

References

Further reading
 Kierkegaard, Søren. "The Lily in the Field and the Bird in the Air" in Hong, Howard Vincent and Hong, Edna Hatlestad. Without Authority, Princeton University Press, 1997 

Sayings of Jesus
Gospel of Matthew
Sermon on the Mount
Christianity and nature